George Ian MacLean served as the gold commissioner of Yukon. He remained in office from April 1, 1928 to June 30, 1932. Before assuming office he was the assistant Financial Comptroller of the Department of the Interior in Ottawa. After his term the position of Gold Commissioner and Comptroller were combined in 1932 with the Comptroller being the title for the chief executive. Spelling was changed to Controller in 1936.

Death
He died in Vancouver on December 16, 1939.

References

Commissioners of Yukon
1939 deaths
Year of birth missing
Gold commissioners